Keith William Fear (born 8 May 1952 in Bristol) is an English former professional footballer who played as a forward in the Football League for Bristol City, Hereford United, Blackburn Rovers, Plymouth Argyle, Brentford, Chester. He also played in the North American Soccer League for St. Louis Stars and later served as commercial manager at Bangor City. He was briefly manager of Mangotsfield United during the 1988–89 season.

Honours 
 Bristol City Hall of Fame

Career statistics

References

1952 births
Living people
Footballers from Bristol
English footballers
Association football forwards
Bristol City F.C. players
St. Louis Stars (soccer) players
Hereford United F.C. players
Blackburn Rovers F.C. players
Plymouth Argyle F.C. players
Brentford F.C. players
Chester City F.C. players
Wimbledon F.C. players
Bangor City F.C. players
English Football League players
North American Soccer League (1968–1984) players
Mangotsfield United F.C. managers
English expatriate sportspeople in the United States
Expatriate soccer players in the United States
English expatriate footballers
English football managers